For the English folk song written by King Henry VIII, see Pastime with Good Company.

Past Times with Good Company is a double live album by the band Blackmore's Night, recorded in May 2002 in Groningen, the Netherlands. It was released in October 2002 in Europe and in February 2003 in the USA and Canada. The European version includes a Greek rendition of "Home Again" and extra live tracks recorded at a press show in Solingen, Germany. CD 2 of the special Limited Edition leather-bound hard-cover package includes two bonus tracks: an acoustic "Fires At Midnight" and "Home Again" sung in Greek. The album's title is a homage to the 16th century English folk song "Pastime with Good Company", composed by King Henry VIII, and performed in a special 2-part arrangement by Blackmore's Night on this recording. "Fires At Midnight" is another piece with a royal lineage, attributed to King Alphonso X of Spain.

Track listing

Personnel
 Ritchie Blackmore - electric and acoustic guitar, mandolin, mandola, hurdy-gurdy, Renaissance drum
 Candice Night - vocals, shawn, rauschpfeife, tambourine, pennywhistle, cornamuse
 Sir Robert of Normandie (Bob Curiano) - bass, rhythm guitar, harmony vocals
 Carmine Giglio - keyboards, harmony vocals
 Squire Malcolm of Lumley - drums
 Kevin Dunne - drums on 16th Century Greensleeves
 Lady Rraine - harmony vocals
 Chris Devine - violin, recorder, mandolin

Production notes
 Produced by Ritchie Blackmore

Covers
Two of the tracks on this album are covers from Ritchie Blackmore's earlier bands. 
"Soldier of Fortune" is a Deep Purple song, from their Stormbringer album.
"16th Century Greensleeves" comes from Rainbow's Ritchie Blackmore's Rainbow debut album.

Charts

References

Blackmore's Night albums
2002 live albums
SPV/Steamhammer albums